The Angel Factory is a 1917 American silent drama film directed by Lawrence B. McGill and starring Antonio Moreno, Helene Chadwick and Armand Cortes.

Cast
 Antonio Moreno as David Darrow 
 Helene Chadwick as Florence Lamont 
 Armand Cortes as Tony Podessa 
 Margaret Greene as Betty 
 Suzanne Willa as Marie Lacy 
 Frank Conlan as Sailor Bill

References

Bibliography
 Donald W. McCaffrey & Christopher P. Jacobs. Guide to the Silent Years of American Cinema. Greenwood Publishing, 1999.

External links
 

1917 films
1917 drama films
1910s English-language films
American silent feature films
Silent American drama films
American black-and-white films
Films directed by Lawrence B. McGill
Pathé Exchange films
1910s American films